The 2014 general election was the last election that a united Andhra Pradesh took part in, as the state was bifurcated into Andhra Pradesh and Telangana states less than a month after the polls. In Andhra Pradesh there are 25 Lok sabha constituencies and were scheduled to go for voting on 7 May 2014 and results are announced on 16 May 2014, and the new state of Telangana was carved out from Andhra Pradesh on 2 June 2014.

Polling
Elections were held in 2 phases i.e. 7th and 8th phases of General election 2014 on 30 April, and 7 May 2014.

Phase 1
Polling passed off peacefully with more than 72 percent of more than 28.1  a million voters exercising their franchise in the 10 districts in the region. Chief Electoral Officer Bhanwarlal said the polling could touch 75 percent. In 2009, the percentage was 67.71 in the region

Phase 2
Chief Electoral Officer Bhanwar Lal said around 76.80 percent of the 36.8  a million voters exercised their franchise across 175 Assembly and 25 Lok Sabha constituencies in the region and the voting percentage is likely to touch 80. The highest turnout of 82.97 percent was recorded in Guntur district and the lowest of 70 percent in Visakhapatnam district.

Voting and results

Results by party wise

|-style="background:#e9e9e9;"
!colspan="2" style="text-align:left"|Party
!Seats
! +/−
!Votes
!%
! +/−
|-
|
|2
|
|
|
|
|-
|
|16
|
|
|
|
|-
|
|9
|
|
|
|
|-

|
|11
|
|
|
|
|-

|
|3
|
|
|
|
|-

|
|1
|
|
|
|
|-

|
|0
|
|
|
|
|-

|
|0
|
|
|
|
|-

|
|0
|
|
|
|
|-

|
|0
|
|
|
|
|-

| colspan=7 style="text-align:left;" |Source: 
|}

List of elected members

Opinion polls

References

Indian general elections in Andhra Pradesh
2010s in Andhra Pradesh
Andhra